Kannappanunni is a 1977 Indian Malayalam-language film based on Kalaripayattu, the traditional martial art of India. It was the 100th film featuring Prem Nazir and Sheela as the leading pair. It was Udaya Studio's 75th film. The film was directed and produced by Kunchako. The film stars Prem Nazir, Sheela, Sukumari and Jayabharathi . The film has musical score and songs by K. Raghavan.

Cast
 
Prem Nazir
Sheela 
Jayabharathi
K. P. Ummer
Adoor Bhasi
Vijayalalitha
Jayan
Sukumari  
G. K. Pillai 
Thikkurissy Sukumaran Nair  
Janardanan 
N. Govindankutty
Meena
Sreelatha
Master Raghu
Adoor Pankajam
Pankajavalli
 P. K. Abraham
Premji
Abbas
Santo Krishnan
Kaduvakulam Antony
Gundumani
Sulochana

Soundtrack
The music was composed by K. Raghavan.

References

External links
  
 

1977 films
1970s Malayalam-language films
Indian martial arts films
Films directed by Kunchacko
Kalarippayattu films
Cross-dressing in Indian films
1977 martial arts films